Silvery Wind is a 1954 Czech drama film directed by Václav Krška based on the novel Stříbrný vítr by Fráňa Šrámek.

Cast
 Eduard Cupák as Student Jan Ratkin
 František Šlégr as Rudolf Ratkin
 Marie Brožová as Jarmila Ratkinová
 Radovan Lukavský as Uncle Jiří
 Vladimír Ráž as Professor Ramler
 Bedřich Vrbský as Catechist
 Jana Rybářová as Anička Karasová
 Josef Vinklář as Student Franta Valenta
 Oldřich Slavík as Student Hugo Staněk
 Jaroslav Wagner as Majer
 Ilja Racek as Vika
 Miloš Kopecký as Lt. Gerlič

Release
The was released in cinemas on 30 November 1956.

References

External links
 

1954 films
1954 drama films
Czech drama films
Czechoslovak drama films
1950s Czech-language films
Films directed by Václav Krska
Czechoslovak black-and-white films
1950s Czech films